Samsenethai() also called Oun Huan() was the second king of Lan Xang in Laos. He succeeded his father, Fa Ngum.

He ruled from 1372 until 1417. The origin of the name Samsenethai is thought to be a reflection of the political and social upheaval occurring within the area at the time of his rule. Samsenethai literally means "300,000 Thai," thus reflected the result of a census conducted in his reign. It is unclear whether the census included the entire population or just men capable of bearing arms. 

There is also discussion as to whether during this period, the terms "Thai" and "Lao" were interchangeable, whether the term "Lao" yet existed, or whether "Thai" was used in his name to refer to the fact that the census included all Tai groups. Local Thai history records that Samsenethai's Mother was a high born lady of Ayuttaya (Siam - Thailand) and that she had brought Thai Ministers for the government of Lan Xiang (Lan Chiang).  Also noteworthy, the flag adopted for Lan Xiang is a near copy of the flag of Ayuttaya.  Red background with a White elephant in the center. For the duration of his 43-year reign, Lan Xang did not fight a single battle. 

Wat Manorom, Wat Oubôsôt, and Wat Xiang Kham were built in Samsenethai's reign. He was succeeded by his son Lan Kham Deng.

Family
Father: Fa Ngum
Mother: Queen Keo Kang Ya - (from Khmer Empire) (d. 1368)
Consorts and their respective issues:
 Queen Buvana Dhanipaya (Bua Then Fa), Princess Keava Nawi Anungahaya - a daughter of his uncle (m.1377)
 Prince Lamakamadinga Lan Kham Deng, King of Lan Xang (r.1416-1428)
 Nang Nawiangsari (Noi On Sor) - daughter of the King of Lan Na
 Prince Gunikama (Konekham) (Khon Kham) - King of Lan Xang (r.1430–1432)
 Queen Keava Rudhi Fa (Nang Keo Lot Fa)  - his cousin, widow of his father, and daughter of King Ramadipati of Ayudhaya (m.1393)
 Princess Nang Keava Sridha (Chao Nang Keo Sida) - daughter of Chao Sidhakama (Sida Kham), "Hsenwifa" of Muang Lü (Chieng Hung)
 Prince Kama Dharmasara (Kham Tam Sa) - King of Lan Xang (r.1432)
 Princess Nang Keava Yudhi Fa (Nang Keo Yot Fa) - his cousin, and a daughter of King Intharacha of Ayutthaya
 Prince Wangsapuri (Vong Buri), (Sai Tia Kaphut), King of Lan Xang (r.1442-1480)
 Princess Mahakani (Maha Kay) - died before 1408, aged five. 
 a slave
 Kham Keul or Kham-Kert - King of Lan Xang (1436-1438)
 by unknown women
 Prince Luvanajaya (Thao Lue-Sai), King of Lan Xang, r.1432-1433
 Thao Somphon
 Princess Anusha (Anocha).
 Princess Manura (Manora).
 Princess Supadhatri (Supatthat).

References

Kings of Lan Xang
14th-century births
1416 deaths
14th-century Laotian people
15th-century Laotian people
14th-century monarchs in Asia
15th-century monarchs in Asia
Laotian Theravada Buddhists
Year of birth unknown